The Isle Royale Light, or Menagerie Island Light, is a lighthouse within Isle Royale National Park, in Keweenaw County, northern Michigan, United States.

Description

It is located in Lake Superior on Menagerie Island, the most easterly of the group of small islands at the opening of Siskiwit Bay, near the southern shore of Isle Royale.

The light's residence has steel shutters for protection from stormwater damage, as this portion of Lake Superior has very severe storms.

History
The Isle Royale Light was built in 1875 of red sandstone, as a U.S. Coast Guard lighthouse.<ref>Seeing the Light, Menagerie Island Light — comprehensive history of the Isle Royale Light, documented by Terry Pepper.</ref>

It was placed on the National Register of Historic Places in 1983.

References

 "Unwatched Light with Stand-By at Isle Royal Light Station, Mich." Lighthouse Service Bulletin III, 62 (Feb 1, 1929), pp. 276–277.
 Lighthouse Central, Managerie Island light The Ultimate Guide to Upper Michigan Lighthouses — by Jerry Roach. (Publisher: Bugs Publishing LLC - 2007).

External links

 National Park Service.gov: Maritime Heritage, Inventory of Historic Lighthouses — the Isle Royale Light — Isle Royale National Park.
 Michigan Lighthouse Conservancy: Isle Royale Light
 Marinas.com: aerial photos of Isle Royale Light (Menagerie Island Light)
 Boatnerd.com: "Menagerie Island (Isle Royale) Light" — by David Wobser; Great Laker'' magazine;  December, 2004. 
 Isle Royale National Park: History & Culture
 Interactive map of lighthouses, Central Lake Superior, powered by Google.
 Interactive map of lighthouses in eastern Lake Superior, powered by Google.
 

Lighthouses in Keweenaw County, Michigan
Lake Superior
Isle Royale National Park
Lighthouses on the National Register of Historic Places in Michigan
Lighthouses completed in 1875
Uninhabited islands of Michigan
National Register of Historic Places in Isle Royale National Park